The Women's Hammer Throw event at the 2005 World Championships in Athletics was held at the Helsinki Olympic Stadium on August 10 and August 12. The qualification standard was set at 70.00 metres or at least the best 12 qualified for the final round.

Medalists

Schedule
All times are Eastern European Time (UTC+2)

Abbreviations
All results shown are in metres

Records

Qualification

Group A

Group B

Final

See also
2005 Hammer Throw Year Ranking

References

External links
IAAF results, heats
IAAF results, final
 hammerthrow.wz

Hammer throw
Hammer throw at the World Athletics Championships
2005 in women's athletics